Ametlla de Mar Observatory is an astronomical observatory situated in L'Ametlla de Mar in the autonomous Catalonia region of Spain. It has received the IAU observatory code 946 and is operated by Catalan astronomer Jaume Nomen. The observatory participates in the "Unicorn Project" and in the  Minor Planet Astrometry group (Grup d'Estudis Astronòmics, GEA).

The Minor Planet Center credits the Ametlla de Mar Observatory with the discovery of 12 numbered minor planets between 2001 and 2002. As of 2016, all numbered bodies remain unnamed and still display their provisional designation.

List of discovered minor planets

See also 
 List of asteroid-discovering observatories
 
 List of observatory codes

References 
 

Minor-planet discovering observatories
Astronomical observatories in Catalonia